Somatidia aranea is a species of beetle in the family Cerambycidae. It was described by entomologist Arthur Sidney Olliff in 1889. It is known from Australia and New Zealand.

References

aranea
Beetles described in 1889